Luis Luna (born 29 December 1983) is a Venezuelan sprinter. He competed in the men's 400 metres at the 2004 Summer Olympics.

References

1983 births
Living people
Athletes (track and field) at the 2004 Summer Olympics
Venezuelan male sprinters
Olympic athletes of Venezuela
Place of birth missing (living people)
South American Games silver medalists for Venezuela
South American Games medalists in athletics
Competitors at the 2002 South American Games
Central American and Caribbean Games medalists in athletics
21st-century Venezuelan people